The 2015 Royal London One-Day Cup tournament was the scheduled limited overs cricket competition for 2015 season of England and Wales first-class counties. It was won by Gloucestershire County Cricket Club, who defeated Surrey by the narrow margin of six runs, despite a hat-trick from Jade Dernbach, in what was described as 'a thrilling finish'. The title was Gloucestershire's first trophy since the 2004 Cheltenham & Gloucester Trophy, when they defeated a Worcestershire side that included 2015 Surrey captain Gareth Batty.

Format 

The competition consisted of two groups of nine teams, with the top four teams from each group progress to the quarter-finals. The groups for the 2015 season were drawn and are shown below in their respective groups.

Group stage

Group A

Table

Fixtures

Group B

Table

Fixtures

Knockout stage

Quarter-finals

Semi-finals

Final

See also
ECB 40

References

External links
Official Site

Royal London One-Day Cup
Royal London One-Day Cup
Royal London One-Day Cup